Platylobium is a genus of flies in the family Stratiomyidae.

Distribution
Peru.

Species
Platylobium zurstrasseni Lindner, 1933

References

Stratiomyidae
Brachycera genera
Taxa named by Erwin Lindner
Diptera of South America
Endemic fauna of Peru